Rosolino is an Italian surname. Notable people with the surname include:

 Frank Rosolino (1926–1978), American jazz trombonist
 Massimiliano Rosolino (born 1978), Italian swimmer

Italian-language surnames